Tooth pathology is any condition of the teeth that can be congenital or acquired. Sometimes a congenital tooth diseases are called tooth abnormalities. These are among the most common diseases in humans The prevention, diagnosis, treatment and rehabilitation of these diseases are the base to the dentistry profession, in which are dentists and dental hygienists, and its sub-specialties, such as oral medicine, oral and maxillofacial surgery, and endodontics. Tooth pathology is usually separated from other types of dental issues, including enamel hypoplasia and tooth wear.

Examples

Congenital
 Anodontia

Acquired
 Dental caries—Dental caries are known as cavities or tooth decay Bacteria in the mouth use foods that contain sugar or starch to produce acids which eat away at the tooth’s structure causing destruction to the enamel of the teeth. Meanwhile, the minerals in saliva (calcium and phosphate) together with fluoride are repairing the enamel.  Dental caries is a chronic disease that can be prevented and show strongly in 6- to 11-year-old children and 12- to 19-year-old adolescents.  9 out of 10 adults are affected with some type of tooth decay. Prevention includes good oral hygiene that consists of brushing twice daily, flossing, eating nutritious meals and limiting snacking, and visiting the dentist on a regular basis.  Fluoride treatments benefit the teeth by strengthening while sealants help chewing surfaces to not decay. Severe cases can lead to tooth extraction and dentures. 
 Dental abscess—A dental abscess is a collection of pus that accumulates in teeth or gums as a result of bacterial infection, giving rise to a severe throbbing pain at the site of the abscess. It is caused by consuming sugary or starchy food and poor dental hygiene and is treated by a dentist by draining the pus and, possibly, removing the infected tooth/teeth altogether.

See also

 Oral medicine
 Oral and maxillofacial pathology
 Tongue disease

References

External links